"Once, Upon Time", prefixed frequently with either "Chapter Three" or "Flux", is the third episode of the thirteenth series of the British science fiction television programme Doctor Who, and of the six-episode serial known collectively as Doctor Who: Flux. It was first broadcast on BBC One on 14 November 2021. It was written by showrunner and executive producer Chris Chibnall, and directed by Azhur Saleem.

The episode stars Jodie Whittaker as the Thirteenth Doctor, alongside Mandip Gill and John Bishop as her companions, Yasmin Khan and Dan Lewis, respectively.

Plot 
With humanity now on the verge of extinction, the Daleks, Cybermen, and Sontarans occupy most of the remaining planets. In the Temple of Atropos, the Doctor jumps into the time storm and stalls Swarm by hiding Dan, Yaz, and Vinder in their pasts.

Dan experiences his date with his love interest Diane, until the Doctor appears as a hologram and Swarm's companion Passenger abducts Diane. Yaz talks with her police partner and tries to teach her sister a video game, but sees the Doctor instead. Vinder reluctantly relives his time assisting the dictatorial Grand Serpent and his demotion to a remote outpost upon revealing the Serpent's misdeeds, with Yaz as his superior and the Doctor as a hologram. Vinder makes video messages aboard the outpost.

Bel, a survivor of the Flux, evades the Daleks in a forest, finds a Lupari ship and weapons, and escapes to the Cybermen sector. Bel kills a boarding party, then confesses her motivations to the last Cyberman she kills: she is searching for her lover, Vinder. Bel finds Vinder’s messages, and comforts their unborn child. 

The Doctor jumps into her own timestream and recovers memories of her past Fugitive Doctor incarnation and three other Division officers, including the Lupari officer Karvanista, raiding the Temple to confront Swarm and Azure. Swarm appears in his original form and has vessels called Passengers each storing hundreds of thousands of life essences. The Fugitive Doctor has secretly hidden six powerful Mouri priests inside, and unleashes them.

Back in her present, the Doctor finds the priests and encourages them to return to the temple, but the priests forcibly separate her from her past memories to protect her from the time storm's effects. Awsok, a mysterious old entity, chides the Doctor, claiming the Doctor's mission is futile. Awsok reveals the Flux was deliberately created and placed and is the Doctor's fault. 

The Doctor returns Yaz, Dan and Vinder to the present. Azure reveals they knew what the Doctor would do and brought her to Atropos on purpose. Swarm reveals Diane's entrapment in Passenger, and the Doctor and Vinder promise to help Dan get her back before Swarm, Azure and Passenger leave the temple. The Doctor uses the TARDIS to return Vinder to his ravaged home planet and gives him a device to contact her. After taking off, a Weeping Angel jumps out of Yaz's phone and seizes the TARDIS console.

Production

Development 
"Once, Upon Time" was written by showrunner and executive producer Chris Chibnall.

Casting 
The series is the third to feature Jodie Whittaker as the Thirteenth Doctor, and Mandip Gill as Yasmin Khan, with John Bishop having joined the cast for the series as Dan Lewis. The episode featured a guest appearance from Craig Parkinson. Jo Martin also returned as the Fugitive Doctor; her appearance was unannounced prior to the episode's broadcast. Additional guest stars for the episode were announced on 4 November.

Filming 
Azhur Saleem directed the second block, which comprised the third, fifth and sixth episodes of the series.

Broadcast and reception

Broadcast 
"Once, Upon Time" aired on 14 November 2021. The episode serves as the third part of a six-part story, entitled Flux.

Ratings 
Overnight the episode was watched by 3.76 million viewers; it was the fourth most-watched programme of the day only behind Strictly Come Dancing, Top Gear, and Countryfile. The consolidated rating counting all views across all platforms within seven days of broadcast was 4.67 million. The episode was the sixth highest rated programme on BBC1 for the week, but across all channels, it was the fifth highest for the day and failed to make the top fifteen programmes for the week. The episode received an Audience Appreciation Index score of 75.

Critical reception 
On Rotten Tomatoes, a review aggregator website, 6 of 8 critics gave the episode a positive review, with an average rating of 7.2 out of 10. Patrick Mulkern, a reviewer for Radio Times, stated that the episode was "one of the most dizzying and blatantly confusing episodes of Doctor Who." The Independent Isobel Lewis agreed, calling it a "meaningless mess", but said there were some "hopeful moments" among the "bewildering plotlines." Meanwhile, Michael Hogan with The Telegraph disagreed, believing that the "disorienting" episode was the overall goal and that it was "jam-packed with treats for the fans."

References

External links 

 
 
 

2021 British television episodes
Doctor Who multi-Doctor stories
Television episodes written by Chris Chibnall
Thirteenth Doctor episodes